Gugu Dlamini (1962–1998) was a South African woman from KwaMancinza, a town in eastern KwaZulu-Natal province, who was stoned and stabbed to death after she had admitted on a Zulu language radio on World AIDS Day that she was HIV positive.

Before her death, Dlamini had been a volunteer field worker for the National Association of People Living With H.I.V./AIDS.

External links
 Neighbors Kill an H.I.V.-Positive AIDS Activist in South Africa

1962 births
1998 deaths
South African murder victims
HIV/AIDS activists